Paul Hipp (born July 16, 1963) is an American actor, singer, songwriter and filmmaker.

Early life
Paul Hipp was born in Philadelphia, Pennsylvania and grew up in Warminster. He left Pennsylvania for New York City immediately after high school, starting his career playing guitar and singing for tips on the streets of Greenwich Village while studying acting with acting coach Mira Rostova and at HB Studio with William Hickey.

Career
Hipp found employment as a musician at various clubs. At the same time, he started landing roles on TV shows and commercials. He made his New York stage debut in the off-Broadway show Rockabilly Road at the West Bank Theater.

New York filmmaker Abel Ferrara saw one of Hipp's shows and asked him to audition for the role of Nino Valacci in his upcoming film China Girl. Hipp landed the role, and a decades-long collaboration began as he became a mainstay in Ferrara's core group of actors that includes Christopher Walken, Harvey Keitel and Willem Dafoe. During the filming of China Girl, Hipp wrote his first published song, “Midnight For You”, used as the film's end credit theme song.

Hipp then co-starred in the off-Broadway show A Minor Incident with Carole King. Hipp played “Midnight For You” for King, who later credited this song for inspiring her to come out of musical retirement. The two started writing songs together, and King often sat in with Hipp at his New York gigs. The two collaborated on songs for her Capitol Records release City Streets, including the song "I Can't Stop Thinking About You", which Hipp co-wrote and plays guitar and performs backing vocals on. A tour followed the LP release which featured Hipp joining King onstage for a duet on that song. While on stage with King at London's Royal Albert Hall, the producers of a new West End musical Buddy: The Buddy Holly Story saw Hipp. They invited him to audition for the role of Buddy Holly, and he was cast in the role. Buddy opened to rave reviews on 12 October 1989, at The Victoria Palace Theatre, and Hipp was nominated for the Laurence Olivier Award for Outstanding Performance by an Actor in a Musical. The following year, Hipp opened as 'Buddy' at Broadway's Shubert Theater in New York. He was nominated for a Tony Award for his performance and won a Theater World Award.

Hipp appeared in the films Fathers & Sons, with Jeff Goldblum, and as Jesus Christ opposite Harvey Keitel in Abel Ferrara's Bad Lieutenant, for which he also performed the title song, "Bad Lieutenant", with Ferrara. He also appeared as Gene Vincent opposite Donal Logue (as Eddie Cochran) in the play Be-Bop-A-Lula at Hollywood's Theater-Theater before returning to the London stage for the 25th anniversary revival of Hair at the Old Vic, in the role of Berger opposite John Barrowman as Claude. After the show closed, Hipp stayed in London, living in Notting Hill, studying painting, writing songs and performing at various venues in and around London.

Subsequent feature film roles include John Woo's Face Off, Waking The Dead, More Dogs Than Bones (in which Hipp and Joe Mantegna play a pair of bungling hit men), and Joe Odom in Midnight in the Garden of Good and Evil. On TV, he was a series regular on NBC's Three Sisters, among other appearances. In 2000, Hipp made his feature film directorial debut with Death of a Dog, which stars Julie Kessler and Edie Falco, executive produced by Ferrara. Hipp wrote the script, soundtrack and score for the film.

In 2005 Hipp played the half-man-half-woman circus performer Bert/Bertha Hagenbach on the second season of the HBO series Carnivàle. He co-starred in Two Tickets to Paradise (2006) and appeared in South of Pico (2007). He also co-starred in the Showtime pilot Manchild. During the same decade, was a guest star on the TV shows ER, Scrubs, CSI: NY, CSI: Miami, The Closer, Without a Trace and Ugly Betty.

In 2006, for The Huffington Post, Hipp wrote a blog with videos that included satirical musical parodies like his take on Johnny Cash's "Folsom Prison Blues" (with Dick Cheney singing about his hunting mishap) and the Beatles' "I Am the Walrus" (a take-off of George W. Bush's "I’m the Decider" quote). Some of the videos created for The Huffington Post were picked up by national news outlets.

Hipp had a recurring role in the F/X series Terriers and appeared in The Last Godfather. Ferrara directed him in 4:44 Last Day on Earth as well as 2014's Welcome to New York. Hipp contributed the opening and closing credit themes of this film. Hipp guest-starred as guitar-slinging minister Reverend Tim Tom in the ABC's comedy The Middle from 2009 until 2018. He co-starred in and co-wrote the Argentine-American film No Somos Animales.

Music 
Hipp wrote and produced several songs sung by Hilary Duff for the film War, Inc.

He wrote and recorded an album of songs culled from his work for The Huffington Post, called Blog of War. His song, We're Number 37 was circulated on social media and led to an appearance on The Dylan Ratigan Show.

Hipp released a CD of original music called The Remote Distance. Norman Lear appears in the video to "Happy Birthday to Me", the first single from the album.

He also released a CD of songs from and inspired by the film No Somos Animales, called Buenos Aires, in the fall of 2015.

Discography
Blog of War (2008)
The Remote Distance (2015)
Sometimes I'm Rudy (2017)

Filmography

Film

Television

References

External links 
 
 
 Paul Hipp official Facebook
 Paul Hipp official YouTube

1963 births
American male film actors
Living people
Male actors from Philadelphia
Musicians from Philadelphia
People from Warminster, Pennsylvania